Ostyor is a rural locality (a selo) in Roslavlsky District of Smolensk Oblast, Russia.  Population: 

Ostyor had a status of urban-type settlement until December 28, 2004, when it was demoted to a rural locality.

In August 1941, 300 Belarusian Jews arrived in Ostyor in order to extract peat.  In September 1941, they were all murdered in a mass execution perpetrated by an Einsatzgruppen.

References

Sources

Rural localities in Smolensk Oblast
Holocaust locations in Russia